The Foster–Armstrong House is a historic house museum located at 320 River Road (County Route 521) in Montague Township of Sussex County, New Jersey. It was documented by the Historic American Buildings Survey in 1970. It was added to the National Register of Historic Places on July 23, 1979, for its significance in agriculture, architecture, commerce, and exploration/settlement. The house is now part of the Delaware Water Gap National Recreation Area. The museum is managed by the Montague Association for the Restoration of Community History.

History

The house was built  by Julius Foster. In 1812, James B. Armstrong married Foster's daughter. Foster and Armstrong operated a ferry across the nearby Delaware River.

See also
 National Register of Historic Places listings in Sussex County, New Jersey
 List of museums in New Jersey

References

External links
 
 
 

Montague Township, New Jersey
Houses in Sussex County, New Jersey
Historic house museums in New Jersey
National Register of Historic Places in Sussex County, New Jersey
Houses on the National Register of Historic Places in New Jersey
New Jersey Register of Historic Places
Delaware Water Gap National Recreation Area
Historic American Buildings Survey in New Jersey